is a Japanese singer and actor. He is the 11th generation Uta no onīsan of NHK's programme Okaasan to Issho. He graduated from Kunitachi College of Music.

Discography

Singles

Albums

DVD

Stage

TV Program

Dubbing 
Coco, Papá

References

External links
 
 – Official Blog 
Recochoku NHK Okaasan to Issho/Daisuke Yokoyama-Takumi Mitani songs list 
Recochoku NHK Okaasan to Issho/Daisuke Yokoyama-Atsuko Ono songs list 

Japanese male actors
Ken-On artists
People from Chiba (city)
1983 births
Living people
21st-century Japanese singers
21st-century Japanese male singers